Debate and Rhyme is the first studio album by the progressive metal band, No More Pain. It was recorded and mixed at Shorefire Recording Studios in Long Branch, NJ. 
While in the studio, singer Ryan Sullivan and guitarist Mike Santini left the band. Guitarist/vocalist Mike Rainone joined the band before the album's released, but did not actually play on it.
It was released on October 21, 2011.

Track listing

Personnel
 Mike Roman - vocals, guitar, keyboards
 Matt McDermott - keyboards
 Jay Weinstein - bass
 Dan Rainone -  drums, percussion

Additional Musicians
 Mike Santini- guitars on "So They Say" and "Debate and Rhyme"
 Ryan Sullivan- additional vocals on "Never Free

Production
 Produced by No More Pain (band)
 Engineered and mixed by Joe DeMaio at Shorefire Recording Studios in Long Branch NJ
 Mastered by Dan Rainone

References

2011 albums
No More Pain (band) albums